Houston Wrestling/Gulf Athletic Club is a now-defunct professional wrestling promotion that ran from the mid-1920s through 1987. Originally run by the Sigel family, it reached its greatest popularity under Paul Boesch.

History
Houston's wrestling legacy began shortly before World War I, with shows being held at irregular intervals from 1915—1923. Inspired by this, promoter Julius Sigel started Houston's City Auditorium (which has long since been torn down). Following the creation of this historic building, wrestlers began showing up in Houston on a regular basis to perform in weekly Friday night shows.

In 1929, Sigel left to promote shows in New Orleans and Shreveport, Louisiana, leaving the promotion to his brother, Morris Sigel. Morris was not well versed in the wrestling business, but guided the promotion through strong business sense and surrounding himself with people capable of running wrestling shows without his help. During this time, a wrestler from Brooklyn, New York named Paul Boesch was on the wrestling scene, who would ultimately be one of Morris Sigel's main men.

Paul Boesch era
In 1947, Boesch was in a serious car accident that forced him to retire from performing. Sigel hired him as a backstage aid and radio announcer. As television became popular in Houston around 1949, Boesch became Houston Wrestling's first television commentator. After several years of jumping channels, Houston Wrestling ended up on Houston independent station KHTV (now KIAH), at which point it became a national phenomenon for over 30 years.

Morris Sigel died on December 26, 1966. In early 1967, Boesch bought the Gulf Athletic Club from Sigel's widow, realizing that he was ultimately in the best position to carry on the Houston Wrestling legacy. Boesch noted that he had been training for this position for over two decades without realizing it, and was ready to practice his own ideas and run the company himself. Under his control, Houston Wrestling expanded its legacy, becoming one of the most popular promotions in the nation, rivaling even Dallas' popular World Class Championship Wrestling promotion. Wrestlers such as Billy Red Lyons and Gary Hart (wrestler) acknowledged Houston Wrestling as one of the best in the nation, and also praised Boesch as an honest man and a great promoter who almost always drew sell-outs for his cards.

Boesch spent 21 years promoting in the Houston region out of the Sam Houston Coliseum, and affiliated himself with rival promotions (e.g., American Wrestling Association; Southwest Sports; World Class Championship Wrestling; Southwest Championship Wrestling; Mid-South Wrestling/Universal Wrestling Federation) to bring the best wrestlers and matches to his fanbase.  

In the 1980s, amid the rise of cable television and rival territories' war to become the U.S.' sole national promotion, Houston Wrestling slid into decline. As some of its partner-promotions (e.g.,  Mid-South Wrestling/Universal Wrestling Federation) sold-out to larger rivals like Jim Crockett Promotions, Boesch chose to work with Vince McMahon's even larger World Wrestling Federation (later renamed WWE), instead. After a four-month partnership with the WWF, Boesch ended his career by promoting a retirement show on August 28, 1987. The show had a sell-out crowd of 12,000 fans, and effectively ended the Houston Wrestling promotion/territory. During the show, then-U.S. Vice President George H. W. Bush honored Boesch via telegram. Boesch died two years later.

Roster
Houston Wrestling maintained a very fluid roster due to its reliance on other promotions to provide talent for its shows.

The following wrestlers were at shows working for Houston Wrestling:
 Junkyard Dog
 Kamala the Ugandan Giant
 Jake the Snake Roberts
 King Kong Bundy
 Wahoo McDaniel
 Nick Kozak
 Bull Curry
 Fritz Von Erich
 Hacksaw Duggan
 Dick Murdoch
 Johnny Valentine
 Danny McShain
 Boris Malenko
 Nick Bockwinkel
 Sputnik Monroe
 The Kozak Brothers
 The Midnight Express
 Rock & Roll Express
 J. J. Dillon
 Bruiser Brody
 Gary Hart (wrestler)
 Leo Newman
 Jim Cornette
 Shawn Michaels
The Blade Runners - Sting & The Ultimate Warrior
Other popular wrestlers who made regular appearances for the promotion included:
 Jose Lothario
 Mil Mascaras
 Ernie Ladd
 Terry Funk
 Dory Funk
 Harley Race
 Red Bastien
 Ivan Putski
 Superstar Billy Graham
 Gino Hernandez
 Andre the Giant
 Bob Backlund
 Bruno Sammartino
 Stan Stasiak
 Terry Taylor
 Barry Darsow
 Tony Atlas
 Bruce Prichard

External links
Slam Wrestling Article on Houston Wrestling
Houston Wrestling at Obsessed With Wrestling

Independent professional wrestling promotions based in Texas
Entertainment companies disestablished in 1987
Professional wrestling in Houston
1922 establishments in Texas
1987 disestablishments in Texas